Daniele Ranzoni (1843 in Intra, Novara – 1889 in Intra, Novara)  was an Italian painter of second half of the 19th century.

Biography

Daniele Ranzoni was born to a working-class family (his father was a cobbler), in Intra, a town today incorporated into the municipality of Verbania-Pallanza on the Piedmont side of Lake Maggiore.

A precocious artist, he started his academic training at age thirteen at the Brera Academy in Milan, a city at the time still under the Austrian rule. At the insistence of his rich patrons from Intra, he continued his studies at the Albertina Academy in Turin – a logical choice for somebody born in Piedmont- But owing to a prestigious scholarship from the Collegio Caccia in Novara he was granted the right to resume his studies at Brera in Milan, where he trained under Giuseppe Bertini a remarkable teacher who encouraged his pupils to sketch from nature and experiment with primary colors.

There he befriended Tranquillo Cremona and the sculptor Giuseppe Grandi. Their friendship and shared aesthetics gave rise, in the 1870s, to a revolutionary style in the visual arts, known as Scapigliatura, a movement rightly considered the first Italian avant-garde in the visual art. In fact Ranzoni is the inventor of the technique through which shape delineation is replaced by a building of forms through nuances of colors. Vibrant splashes of color are applied directly on the canvas, without preliminary drawing, in a cursory brushwork that emphasizes tonal nuances, and suggests volumes and contrasts of light. The revolutionary manner initiated by Ranzoni and Cremona in the 1870s is similar to what the Impressionist group achieved in Paris in the same decade. However, while the former were mostly interested in translating the immediacy of the vision and tended to concentrate on landscape, Ranzoni and the Scapigliati neglected out of door painting, preferring to concentrate on portrait, the expression of emotions, intensity of moods and psychological introspection.

Ranzoni is essentially a portrait painter. In facts, he became the artist of the international milieu of aristocratic expats that gathered around Lake Maggiore in the 1870s and 1880s. Living between Milan and his native Intra, he had a liaison with Ada Troubetzkoy, an American opera singer who had married Prince Pierre Troubetzkoy, scion of an important Russian family. She was mother of three boys, whose artistic education she entrusted to Ranzoni. Two of these pupils became artists, Paul Troubetzkoy, the internationally renowned Belle Époque sculptor and Pierre, the society painter. Ada had introduced Ranzoni of the privileged society who frequented Lake Maggiore. He became their painter and owing to their connections he was invited to England where he spent two years as painter of the English gentry (1878/1879).

Upon his return, he had to face the demise of the cosmopolitan society which he had portrayed with so much insight. In Milan, after the death of Cremona (July 1878), the Scapigliatura of the street happenings and of the endless debates in the “Osterie “was but a memory. On Lake Maggiore Villa Ada had been sold and the separation of the couple was destroying the family of Ranzoni’s ex pupils. Around Lake Maggiore the expats were returning home, unable to resist the global economic crisis defined as “Long Depression” (1873-1896) in the Anglo-Saxon world, to differentiate it from the “Great Depression” of the 1930s. Bankruptcies and suicides were a daily occurrence. From 1880 to 1885 Ranzoni produced his most important works. Aware of the progressive destruction of his world,  he reacted with a feverish activity accompanied by despair. A mental breakdown occurred and he was forcefully committed to the Psychiatric Hospital of Novara where he remained from March, 22 to May 6, 1885. As if mental illness had intensified the acuteness of his vision, this tormented period (just before and immediately after the hospitalization) corresponds to the acme in Ranzoni’s evolution.  He died on October 29, 1889. The rare works produced between 1885 and his death, owing to their expressionist intensity are among the most moving of the late Nineteenth century. They have become abstract creations in which the paint is spare to maximum and color reduced to two tones, or at time, simply to a chromatic scale of on tone, a palette of grays, whose nuances suggest not only the fleeting quality of light but also the estrangement of the artist in front of his sitter.

Bibliography 

 Carlo Carrà. Daniele Ranzoni. Roma, 1924 
 Severino Pagani. La pittura lombarda della Scapigliatura. Milano 1955
 Margherita Sarfatti. Daniele Ranzoni. Reale Accademia d'Italia, Roma, 1935
 Renzo Boccardi, Giovani Borellli, Vittore Grubicy, Luigi Conconi, Raffaele Giolli, Daniele Ranzoni. Ottanta riproduzioni delle sue migliori opere, Alfieri & Lacroix, Milano 1911
 Ugo Ojetti. Ritratti d'artisti italiani: Daniele Ranzoni. Treves, Milano, 1931
 Annie-Paule Quinsac (Editor)Catalogo della Mostra Daniele Ranzoni 1843-1889, Centenario della morte, presso il Palazzo della Permanente, Milano, Mazzotta Editore, 1989.
 Piera Imbrico, Daniele Ranzoni (Intra1843-1889), Intra Alberti Editore Libraio 1989 
 Annie-Paule Quinsac, Daniele Ranzoni. Catalogo ragionato dei dipinti e dei disegni, Skira, Milano 1997. 
 Annie-Paule Quinsac (Editor) Scapigliatura, Catalogue of the Exhibition held in Milan, at Palazzo Reale, Scapigliatura, June–November 2009, Venice, Marsillio Editore, 2009.
 Annie-Paule Quinsac (Editor), Ranzoni. Lo scapigliato maudit, Catalogue of the Milan Exhibition held at Gallerie Maspes, March–June 2017 Grafica Antiga, Milan 2017.

Works 
Ranzoni paintings are mostly in private collections. Only eight Museums - all of them in Northern Italy- count Ranzoni’s paintings or drawings among their holdings.

The most important nucleus extant in public collections is divided between the Landscape Museum in Pallanza - Verbania and the civic collections in Milan, Galleria d’Arte Moderna and the Castello Sforzesco. The municipal “Galleria d’Arte Moderna Paolo e Adele Giannoni” in Novara, holds in permanent loans the two paintings of the Collegio Caccia, Ritratto di Giovane Donna and Fratello e sorella. Since the publication of the Catalogue raisonné, Varese (Castello di Masnago) Biella (Museo Civico) and Pavia (Castello Visconteo) have acquired through donation one or two paintings, oil or watercolor. The Pinacoteca of the Fondzione Cassa di Risparmia in Tortona has bought The Portrait of the child Ettore Nicò.

Sources 

Annie-Paule Quinsac, Daniele Ranzoni. Catalogo ragionato dei dipinti e dei disegni, Skira, Milano 1997. 
http://danieleranzoni.it/  Italian and English versions

External links 
 Verbania, Museo del Paesaggio di Intra
 Milano,Galleria d’arte Moderna
 Milano, Castello Sforzesco 
 Novara, Civica galleria d’arte moderna Paolo e Adele Giannoni
 Varese, Castello di Masnago
 Pavia, Castello Visconteo
 Biella, Museo del Territorio Biellese
 Tortona, Pinacoteca della Fondazione Cassa di Risparmio di Tortona 
 DanieleRanzoni.it

1843 births
1889 deaths
19th-century Italian painters
Italian male painters
Painters from Milan
Scapigliatura Movement
Divisionist painters
19th-century Italian male artists
People from Intra